The Last of the Mohicans, later retitled Hawkeye and the Last of the Mohicans is a 1957 historical drama television series made for syndication by ITC Entertainment and Normandie Productions. It ran for one season of 39 half-hour monochrome episodes. The series is available on DVD and some episodes on VHS.

Plot

Loosely based on the 1826 novel The Last of the Mohicans by James Fenimore Cooper, the series was released under several different names, including Hawkeye and The Last of the Mohicans.

The series was set in New York's Hudson Valley in the 1750s but was filmed in Canada. The end credits state that the series was filmed in Canada with the cooperation of The Canadian Broadcasting Corporation.

The series had a more realistic view of America than most series of the times. The settlers were rough and dressed in old but suitable clothes for the long hard winters in the small settlements of the new frontier. The Native Americans were more realistically portrayed too, as an intelligent people with good and bad individuals among them. Fights in the film needed more than just the odd blow as the opponents hit hard at each other, and torture was used in a number of episodes. Weapons used were normally single shot rifles and tomahawks (which often ended up in someone's back). Furs were often a motive of crime as they were the currency of the northern settlements.

Main cast 
  John Hart as Nat Cutler (aka "Hawkeye")
 Lon Chaney Jr. as Chingachgook

Filming locations

Outdoor scenes 
 Valley Farm Rd., 3rd Concession and Brock Road area
 Duffins Creek valley up through to just north of Whites Road and Taunton Road in Pickering, Ontario

Indoor scenes 
Lakeshore Studios, Toronto, Ontario, Canada

Episode list 
This episode list is in airdate order, based on the earliest known syndication showing of each episode in the United States.

 Hawkeye's Homecoming
 The Threat
 Franklin Story
 The Wild One
 Delaware Hoax
 The Coward
 Ethan Allen Story
 The Witch
 The Medicine Man
 The Servant
 The Search
 Snake Tattoo
 False Witness
 Powder Keg
 Scapegoat
 Way Station
 The Brute
 Stubborn Pioneer
 The Promised Valley
 The Girl
 The Soldier
 Huron Tomahawk
 Tolliver Gang
 The Colonel and his Lady
 Washington Story
 Winter Passage
 The Reckoning
 La Salle's Treasure
 The Prisoner
 False Faces
 The Morristown Story
 Revenge
 The Contest
 The Truant
 The Royal Grant
 The Long Rifles
 The Printer
 The Indian Doll
 Circle of Hate

DVD releases
On November 21, 2006, Timeless Media Group released a 2-disc best-of set featuring 10 episodes from the series.

In 2011, Network in the UK released remastered versions of all 39 episodes on a five disc DVD set, catalogue number 7953072.

References

External links 
 Hawkeye and the Last of the Mohicans Page
 
 
 CTA information

Television series by ITC Entertainment
1950s Canadian drama television series
1957 Canadian television series debuts
1958 Canadian television series endings
Black-and-white Canadian television shows
James Fenimore Cooper